William E. Kaufman is an American Conservative rabbi, philosopher, theologian and author. His 1991 book, The Case for God, was perhaps the first book written on Jewish process theology.

Early life and education
Kaufman was born on December 28, 1938, in Philadelphia, Pennsylvania. He is the son of the late Harry Kaufman and Elizabeth (Sladovsky) Kaufman. He was a Phi Beta Kappa graduate of the University of Pennsylvania in 1959 with an undergraduate major in philosophy. Kaufman was ordained as a rabbi by the Jewish Theological Seminary in 1964. He received his Ph.D. in philosophy from Boston University in 1971. He received a Doctor of Divinity honorary degree from the Jewish Theological Seminary in 1990.

Rabbinic career and personal life
From 1964–1967 he was assistant rabbi at Congregation Kehillath Israel in Brookline, Massachusetts. In 1967 he assumed the rabbinical post at Congregation B’nai Israel in Woonsocket, Rhode Island, where he served until 1980.  From 1980 to 1982 he was rabbi at Congregation Agudas Achim in San Antonio, Texas.  In 1982 he was installed as rabbi at Temple Beth El in Fall River, Massachusetts, where he served until his retirement in November 2005.  Upon his retirement, he was named rabbi emeritus of Temple Beth El.

He is a member of the Rabbinical Assembly, the international association of Conservative rabbis.

He married the former Nathalie Ann Levin of Brookline, Massachusetts in 1965.  They have a son, Ari, a daughter, Beth, and four grandchildren: Maisie, Josephine (Josie), Gabriel and Ryan.

Works
He has published many articles in Judaism (quarterly journal), Conservative Judaism (quarterly journal), The Reconstructionist (quarterly journal), and The Jewish Spectator (quarterly journal.)

One of his projects has been to create a Jewish process theology, viewing Jewish theology through the panentheistic process philosophy of Alfred North Whitehead.

Bibliography

 
 
 
 
 Metaphors for God: A Response Conservative Judaism (journal), Volume 51, No. 2, 1999, The Rabbinical Assembly.

References

American Conservative rabbis
Process theologians
American Jewish theologians
Philosophers of Judaism
20th-century American rabbis
21st-century American rabbis
Living people
Boston University alumni
Jewish Theological Seminary of America alumni
Year of birth missing (living people)
Jewish philosophers